William Gilmore, also known as Bill, Billy, and Shakin' Bill (because he stood still onstage) was an American musician who played the bass and the keyboard.  He grew up in Sarasota, Florida before settling down in Atlanta, Georgia.  He played with The Webs, The Candymen, The Classics IV, and the Atlanta Rhythm Section.

Gilmore first came to attention around 1965, touring as a bass player for Roy Orbison and The Candymen.

Gilmore was featured on "Oh, Pretty Woman" by Roy Orbison and The Candymen in 1964.  He also co-wrote "Party Girl" for Tommy Roe along with Buddy Buie, and also penned tracks for Jay & The Americans.

He died on March 27, 1978, and was survived by wife Andrea and daughters Cherish, Sommer, and Billie-Jean Sunshine.

References

1978 deaths
American rock bass guitarists
American rock keyboardists
Songwriters from Florida
American male bass guitarists
American male songwriters